Kyle Yamada (born April 12, 1983 in Calgary, Alberta) is a Canadian soccer player.

Career

Youth and college
Yamada played four years of college soccer at Lethbridge College, and despite suffering a serious knee injury in his debut season, was named to the All-Canadian soccer team by the Canadian Colleges Athletic Association in 2009.

Professional
Yamada played professional indoor soccer for the Calgary United in the Canadian Major Indoor Soccer League in 2010, before being signed by FC Edmonton of the new North American Soccer League in 2011. He made his professional debut in the team's first competitive game on April 9, 2011, a 2-1 victory over the Fort Lauderdale Strikers, and scored his first professional goal on May 31 in a 4-0 win over FC Tampa Bay. The club re-signed Yamada for the 2012 season on October 12, 2011.

International

Yamada is a beach soccer player, and played for Canada at the 2006 CONCACAF Beach Soccer Championship and the 2006 FIFA Beach Soccer World Cup.

References

External links
 FC Edmonton bio

1983 births
Living people
Canadian sportspeople of Japanese descent
Canadian beach soccer players
Canadian soccer players
FC Edmonton players
Soccer players from Calgary
North American Soccer League players
Association football midfielders